is a Japanese-language daily newspaper published by The Minato-Yamaguchi Co., Ltd.

Corporate profile

The Minato-Yamaguchi Co., Ltd.
Publishing newspapers : Minato Shimbun, Yamaguchi Shimbun, etc.

Location
Shimonoseki Head Office
1-1-7, Higashi-Yamato-machi, Shimonoseki, Yamaguchi, Japan

External links
Minato Shimbun in Japanese

1946 establishments in Japan
Newspapers established in 1946
Daily newspapers published in Japan
Japanese-language newspapers
Yamaguchi Prefecture
Mass media in Shimonoseki